Bellevue Hospital (officially NYC Health + Hospitals/Bellevue and formerly known as Bellevue Hospital Center) is a hospital in New York City and the oldest public hospital in the United States. One of the largest hospitals in the United States by number of beds, it is located at 462 First Avenue in the Kips Bay neighborhood of Manhattan, New York City. Bellevue is also home to FDNY EMS Station 08, formerly NYC EMS Station 13.

Historically, Bellevue was popularly associated with its treatment of mentally ill patients such that "Bellevue" became a local pejorative slang term for a psychiatric hospital. The hospital has since developed into a comprehensive major medical center over the years, including outpatient, specialty, and skilled nursing care, as well as emergency and inpatient services. The hospital contains a 25-story patient care facility and has an attending physician staff of 1,200 and an in-house staff of about 5,500. 

Bellevue is a safety net hospital, providing healthcare for individuals regardless of their insurance status or ability to pay. It handles over half a million patient visits each year. In 2014 Bellevue was ranked 40th overall best hospital in the New York metro area and 29th in New York City by U.S. News & World Report.

History

Founding
Bellevue traces its origins to the city's first permanent almshouse, a two-story brick building completed in 1736 on the city common, now City Hall Park.

In 1798, the city purchased Belle Vue farm, a property near the East River several miles north of the settled city, which had been used to quarantine the sick during a series of yellow fever outbreaks. The hospital was formally named Bellevue Hospital in 1824.

By 1787, Columbia University College of Physicians and Surgeons had assigned faculty and medical students to Bellevue. Columbia faculty and students would remain at Bellevue for the next 181 years, until the restructuring of the academic affiliations of Bellevue Hospital in 1968. New York University faculty began to conduct clinical instruction at the hospital in 1819. In 1849, an amphitheater for clinical teaching and surgery opened. In 1861, the Bellevue Hospital Medical College, the first medical college in New York with connections to a hospital, was founded. By 1873, the nation's first nursing school based on Florence Nightingale's principles opened at Bellevue, followed by the nation's first children's clinic in 1874 and the nation's first emergency pavilion in 1876; a pavilion for the insane, an approach considered revolutionary at the time, was erected within hospital grounds in 1879. For that reason, the name Bellevue is sometimes used as a metonym for psychiatric hospitals. Mark Harris in New York called it "the Chelsea Hotel of the mad".

Bellevue initiated a residency training program in 1883 that is still the model for surgical training worldwide. The Carnegie Laboratory, the nation's first pathology and bacteriology laboratory, was founded there a year later, followed by the nation's first men's nursing school in 1888. By 1892, Bellevue established a dedicated unit for alcoholics.

City reorganization
In 1902, the administrative Bellevue and Allied Hospitals organization were formed by the city, under president John W. Brannan. B&AH also included Gouverneur Hospital, Harlem Hospital, and Fordham Hospital. B&AH opened doors to female and black physicians. In the midst of a tuberculosis epidemic a year later, the Bellevue Chest Service was founded.

Bellevue opened the nation's first ambulatory cardiac clinic in 1911, followed by the Western Hemisphere's first ward for metabolic disorders in 1917. New York City's Office of the Chief Medical Examiner began on the second floor in 1918. German spy and saboteur Fritz Joubert Duquesne escaped the hospital prison ward in 1919 after having feigned paralysis for nearly two years.

PS 106, the first public school for the emotionally disturbed children located in a public hospital, opened at Bellevue in 1935. In 1939, David Margolis began work on nine Work Projects Administration murals in entrance rotunda titled Materials of Relaxation, which were completed in 1941. Bellevue became the site of the world's first hospital catastrophe unit the same year; the world's first cardiopulmonary laboratory was established at Bellevue by Andre Cournand and Dickinson Richards a year later, and the nation's first heart failure clinic opened, staffed by Eugene Braunwald, in 1952. In 1960. New York City's Office of the Chief Medical Examiner moved out of the second floor and into its new building at 520 First Avenue, but still maintained close relations with Bellevue. In 1962, Bellevue established the first intensive care unit in a municipal hospital, and in 1964, Bellevue was designated as the stand-by hospital for treatment of visiting presidents, foreign dignitaries, injured members of the city's uniformed services, and United Nations diplomats. Bellevue joined the New York City Health and Hospitals Corporation as one of 11 acute care hospitals in 1970.

In 1981, Bellevue was certified as an official heart station for cardiac emergencies; a year later it was designated as a micro-surgical reimplantation center for the City of New York, by 1983 as a level one trauma center, and by 1988 as a head and spinal cord injury center. In 1990, it established an accredited residency training program in Emergency Medicine. The building that formerly served as the hospital's psychiatric facility started to be used as a homeless intake center and a men's homeless shelter in 1998. The publication of the Bellevue Literary Review, the first literary magazine to arise from a medical center, commenced in 2001; Bellevue Literary Press was founded six years later as a sister organization of the Bellevue Literary Review.

In April 2010, plans to redevelop the former psychiatric hospital building as a hotel and conference center connected to NYU Langone Medical Center fell through. The aftermath of Hurricane Sandy in October 2012 required evacuation of all patients due to power failure and flooding in the basement generators. Bellevue was renamed NYC Health + Hospitals/Bellevue in November 2015 as a reflection of its parent organization's rebranding.

Medical firsts
Multiple firsts were performed at Bellevue in its early years. In 1799, it opened the first maternity ward in the United States. By 1808, the world's first ligation of the femoral artery for an aneurysm was performed there, followed by the first ligation of the innominate artery ten years later.

Bellevue physicians promoted the "Bone Bill" in 1854, which legalized dissection of cadavers for anatomical studies; two years later they started to also popularize the use of the hypodermic syringe. In 1862, the Austin Flint murmur was named for Austin Flint, prominent Bellevue Hospital cardiologist.

By 1867, Bellevue physicians were instrumental in developing New York City's sanitary code, the first in the world. One of the nation's first outpatient departments connected to a hospital (the "Bureau of Medical and Surgical Relief for the Out of Door Poor") was established at Bellevue that year. In 1868, Bellevue physician Stephen Smith became first commissioner of public health in New York City; he initiated a national campaign for health vaccinations. A year later, Bellevue established the second hospital-based, emergency ambulance service in the United States.

In 1889, Bellevue physicians were the first to report that tuberculosis is a preventable disease; five years later was the successful operation of the abdomen for a pistol shot wound. William Tillett discovered streptokinase, later used for the acute treatment of myocardial infarction, at Bellevue in 1933. Nina Starr Braunwald performed the first mitral valve replacement in 1960 at the hospital. In 1967, Bellevue physicians perform the first cadaver kidney transplant. In 1971, the first active immunization for hepatitis B was developed by Bellevue physicians. Bellevue played a key role in the development of the "Triple Drug Cocktail" or HAART, a breakthrough in the treatment of AIDS, in 1996. 

In October 2014, Bellevue took in an Ebola patient, Craig Spencer, an individual who worked with Médecins Sans Frontières (Doctors Without Borders) in Guinea a month prior during the 2014 Ebola virus epidemic in West Africa.

Facilities 

One of the largest hospitals in the United States by number of beds, it handles nearly 460,000 non-ER outpatient clinic visits, nearly 106,000 emergency visits and some 30,000 inpatients each year. More than 80 percent of Bellevue's patients come from the city's medically underserved populations. Bellevue is a safety net hospital, in that it will provide healthcare for individuals regardless of their insurance status or ability to pay.

The hospital occupies a 25-story patient care facility with an ICU, digital radiology communication and an outpatient facility. The hospital has an attending physician staff of 1,200 and an in-house staff of about 5,500.

Bellevue features separate pediatric (0-25) and adult (25+) emergency departments.

In popular culture 
Bellevue has entered popular consciousness through its status as a major hospital in the largest city in the United States. The hospital notably treated the author Norman Mailer, who was taken to Bellevue after he stabbed his wife; and Mark David Chapman, who shuttled between Bellevue and the jail complex on Rikers Island after he shot and killed musician John Lennon. The poet Allen Ginsberg, also a former patient, mentioned the hospital by name in his famous poem "Howl" (1955). 
 
The hospital was mentioned or featured in the end of the music video of the Van Halen song "Hot for Teacher" in which lead guitarist Eddie Van Halen becomes a psychiatric hospital patient after he (fictionally) graduated from school.

Bellevue is referenced by the character Amy in the 1970 Broadway musical Company by Stephen Sondheim. The character, experiencing cold feet on her wedding day, threatens to move into the "hopeless cases" section at the hospital.

In 2000, rapper Wyclef Jean referenced Bellevue in the song "Where Fugees At?" on his album The Ecleftic: 2 Sides II a Book, saying "I send psychos to Bellevue."

Bellevue has been the subject of recent books, including Bellevue: Three Centuries of Medicine and Mayhem at America's Most Storied Hospital (2016), by historian David Oshinsky, Twelve Patients: Life and Death at Bellevue Hospital (2012), by Dr. Eric Manheimer, a former Bellevue medical director,and Singular Intimacies: Becoming a Doctor at Bellevue (2002), by Dr. Danielle Ofri, a long-time physician at Bellevue.

The ABC television sitcom series Barney Miller (1975-1982), and the NBC television sitcom series Night Court (1984-1992), both frequently mentioned "Bellevue" as it was the hospital where many of the mentally ill, or unstable, criminals were sent. Both series were set in New York City.

The NBC television series New Amsterdam (2018-) takes place at a fictionalized version of Bellevue, renamed "New Amsterdam" in the show. Based on Manheimer's book, the series has filmed scenes at Bellevue and other New York City public hospitals.

See also
List of the oldest hospitals in the United States

References

Further reading

External links

 
 NYC Health + Hospitals/Bellevue at NYU Medical Center
 NYU School of Medicine / Library and Archives with Bellevue related collections
 NYC Health + Hospitals/Bellevue Psychiatry Inpatient Services
 

Psychiatric hospitals in New York (state)
Teaching hospitals in New York City
Hospitals in Manhattan
1736 establishments in the Thirteen Colonies
Hospitals established in the 1730s
New York University
Kips Bay, Manhattan
NYC Health + Hospitals
Health facilities that treated Ebola patients
Trauma centers
Public hospitals in the United States